The 1992–93 Coastal Carolina Chanticleers men's basketball team represented Coastal Carolina University during the 1992–93 college basketball season. This was head coach Russ Bergman's fifth season at Coastal Carolina. The Chanticleers competed in the Big South Conference and played their home games at Kimbel Arena. They finished the season 22–10, 12–4 (adjusted to 11–5) in Big South play to finish in second place. The Chanticleers won the 1993 Big South Conference men's basketball tournament to advance to the 1993 NCAA tournament. Playing as the No. 16 seed in the West Region, the team was beaten in the opening round by No. 1 seed and eventual National runner-up Michigan and the famed Fab Five.

Senior forward Tony Dunkin ended his career as the school's career scoring leader. Dunkin was also named the Big South Conference Men's Player of the Year for an unprecedented fourth straight season.

Roster

Schedule and results
Source

|-
!colspan=9 style=| Regular season

|-
!colspan=9 style=| Big South tournament

|-
!colspan=9 style=| NCAA tournament

Awards and honors
Tony Dunkin – Big South Conference Men's Player of the Year (4th)

References

Usc Coastal Carolina
Usc Coastal Carolina
Coastal Carolina Chanticleers men's basketball seasons